André Todescato  (born October 21, 1982, Caxias do Sul, Brazil) is a Brazilian former footballer. He also holds an Italian passport.

External links

Profile at dailymotion.com

1982 births
Living people
Brazilian footballers
Association football defenders
Liga I players
Expatriate footballers in Romania
Esporte Clube Juventude players
América Futebol Clube (MG) players
Clube do Remo players
Brazilian expatriates in Latvia
CD Leganés players
FC Politehnica Iași (1945) players
Skonto FC players
Expatriate footballers in Latvia
NK Zadar players
Expatriate footballers in Croatia
AGOVV Apeldoorn players
Eerste Divisie players
Expatriate footballers in the Netherlands
Brazilian expatriate sportspeople in the Netherlands